Novy Ural (Yañı Ural) is a rural locality (a village) in Kukkuyanovsky Selsoviet, Dyurtyulinsky District, Bashkortostan, Russia. The population was 28 as of 2010. There are 2 streets.

Geography 
Novy Ural is located 42 km southwest of Dyurtyuli (the district's administrative centre) by road. Tuzlukushevo is the nearest rural locality.

References 

Rural localities in Dyurtyulinsky District